Sassenfjorden is a part of Isfjorden at Spitsbergen, Svalbard, in between Bünsow Land and Nordenskiöld Land.  The inner branch of Sassenfjorden is named Tempelfjorden.

References

Fjords of Spitsbergen